Baishui is a town in Longhai county-level city, in the municipal region of Zhangzhou, Fujian. It lies on the right bank of the Jiulong River's south branch.

Specialities
Baishui is famous for its peanut candy, cooked and packaged in streetfront shops throughout the town.

Administration
The town runs 1 neighbourhood and 15 village committees. 

Population : 44682 (2003)

Villages

 Baishui 
 Fangtian 
 Xifeng 
 Jiaobian 
 Loukeng 
 JinAo 
 Jingyuan 
 Shanmei 
 Zhuanglin 
 Cimei 
 Shanbian 
 Xialiao 
 Daxia 
 Xiatian

Transportation
Dongyuan Town lies right across the river and is accessible by ferry.  
A faster, closed-cabin boat takes passengers downriver to Xiamen (40 min).

The Shenyang-Haikou Expressway passes through the town, but has no exit/entrance here.

Notes and references

Zhangzhou